Two ships of the Royal Australian Navy (RAN) have been named HMAS Voyager.
 was a W-class destroyer. Commissioned into the Royal Navy (RN) in 1918. She remained with the RN until 1933, when she was transferred to the RAN. The destroyer remained in service until 23 September 1942, when she ran aground and was scuttled.
 was a Daring-class destroyer commissioned into the RAN in 1957. The ship was lost in a collision with the aircraft carrier  on 10 February 1964.

Battle honours
Seven battle honours were awarded to ships named HMAS Voyager:
Darwin 1942
Calabria 1940
Libya 1940–41
Greece 1941
Crete 1941
Mediterranean 1941
Pacific 1942

See also
USS Voyager

References

Royal Australian Navy ship names